Atena may refer to:

People
 Atena Daemi (born 1988), Iranian civil rights activist, children's rights activist, human rights activist, and political prisoner
 Atena Farghadani (born 1987), Iranian artist and political activist
 Atena Pashko (1931-2012), Ukrainian chemical engineer, poet, and social activist

Other
 Oenomaus atena, species of butterfly of the family Lycaenidae
 Atena Lucana, an Italian municipality in the province of Salerno
 Atena Poznań,  Polish women's football club

See also
Athena (disambiguation)
Athene (disambiguation)
Athens (disambiguation)
Altena (disambiguation)